The Millions More Movement was launched by a broad coalition of African American leaders to mark the commemoration of the 10th Anniversary of the Million Man March. A mass march on Washington, DC, was held on October 15, 2005, to galvanize public support for the movement's goals. The march was open to men, women, and children and focused on creating lasting relationships between participating individuals, faith-based organizations, and community institutions. The movement only rallied a few thousand protesters and was seen as a disappointment.

Issues and goals
Ten key issues identified by the movement organizers are:
Unity, Spiritual Values, Education, Economic Development, Political Power, Reparations, Prison Industrial Complex, Health, Artistic/Cultural Development, Peace

In An Open Letter on the Millions More Movement, Louis Farrakhan stated in part,
For the first time in our history, those of us of different ideologies, philosophies, methodologies, denominations, sects, and religions, political and fraternal affiliations have come together to create the Millions More Movement. Each of us, who have agreed to work together for the benefit of the whole of our people, have said from our particular platforms, based on our beliefs and understanding or the lack thereof, words that have offended members of our own people and others; and our ideology, philosophy, religion, and pronouncements may have hurt the ears and sentiments of others outside of our community. Therefore, this has kept us working inside of our own circles with those who think as we think or believe as we believe. As a result, some of us would never appear on the same stage with one another, for fear of being hurt by association with those with whom we have serious disagreements.

The Millions More Movement is challenging all of us to rise above the things that have kept us divided in the past, by focusing us on the agenda of the Millions More Movement to see how all of us, with all of our varied differences, can come together and direct our energy, not at each other, but at the condition of the reality of the suffering of our people, that we might use all of our skills, gifts and talents to create a better world for ourselves, our children, grandchildren and great grandchildren.

Leaders/co-convenors
 Minister Louis Farrakhan, National Representative of Elijah Muhammad and the Nation of Islam
 Reverend Willie Wilson, National Executive Director
 Leonard Muhammad, National Deputy Director

National co-conveners (partial list)
 Mrs. Coretta Scott King, Martin Luther King Jr. Center for Nonviolent Social Change
 Dr. Benjamin Chavis Muhammad, Hip Hop Summit Action Network
 Rev. Dr. Barbara Williams-Skinner, Skinner Leadership Institute
 Dr. Dorothy Height, National Council of Negro Women
 Dr. Conrad Worrill, National Black United Front
 Attorney Malik Zulu Shabazz, New Black Panther Party
 Charles Steele, Southern Christian Leadership Conference
 Reverend Jesse Jackson, Rainbow/PUSH Coalition
 Phile Chionesu, Millions Women Movement
 Ambassador Asiel Ben Israel, Hebrew Israelite Nation
 Marc Morial, National Urban League
 Councilman Marion Barry and Cora Masters-Barry
 Dr. Julianne Malveaux, author and columnist
 Reverend Al Sharpton, National Action Network
 Dr. Maulana Karenga, The US Organization
 Rt. Bishop Vashti Murphy McKenzie, African Methodist Episcopal Church
 Jim Brown, Amer-I-Can
 Susan L. Taylor, Essence magazine
 Ramona Edelin, Black Leadership Forum
 Fredrica Bey, Women in Support of the Million Man March
 Rev. Michael Jenkins, Family Federation for World Peace and Unification
 Rev. John Hunter, First A.M.E. Church
 Tom Joyner
 Tavis Smiley
 Erykah Badu
 Dr. Leonard Jeffries
 Bob Law
 Danny Bakewell
 Dr. Baba Hannibal Afrik
 Dr. Joseph Lowery
 Dr. Ray Winbush
 Dr. Faye Williams
 Dr. Susan Newman
 Rev. Floyd Flake
 Pastor T.L. Barrett
 Rev. Dr. Barbara King-Outley
 Rev. Dr. Maxine Walker
 Rev. Walter Fauntroy
 Rev. Al Sampson
 Bishop Alvin Richardson
 Bishop Augustus Stallings
 Dennis Courland Hayer
 Kwesi Mfume
 Dr. Molefi Kete Asante
 Ron Daniels
 Ron Walters
 Dr. Julian Bond
 Ambassador Andrew Young
 Ambassador Carole Moseley-Braun
 Rep. Eleanor Holmes-Norton (D.C.)

Endorsers
 AME Church
 AME Zion Church
 Christian Methodist Episcopal Church
 Congressional Black Caucus
 International Brotherhood of Teamsters Union
 National Association of Black Social Workers
 National Bar Association
 National Baptist Convention of America
 National Baptist Convention
 National Black Student Government Association
 National Coalition for Reparations for Blacks in America
 National Conference of Black Mayors
 National Federation of Colored Women’s Clubs
 National Medical Association
 National Pan-Hellenic Council
 Universal Negro Improvement Association

Abbreviated calendar of events
Friday, October 14, National Day of Absence
Saturday, October 15, Official start of events at 10 a.m., some pre-event activities as early as 6 a.m.
Sunday, October 16, Mass Unity Interfaith, Interdenominational Service Sunday evening

See also
List of protest marches on Washington, D.C.

References

External links
CNN Report on the March
Millions More Movement website
Houston Local Organizing Committee
St. Louis Local Organizing Committee
Greater Kansas City Chapter Local Organizing Committee
Washington, D.C. Local Organizing Committee
Al Jazeera: African Americans protest inequality

2005 protests
2005 in Washington, D.C.
October 2005 events in the United States
Louis Farrakhan
Post–civil rights era in African-American history
Nation of Islam
Protest marches in Washington, D.C.